Frank O'Neill may refer to:

Frank "Buck" O'Neill (1875–1958), American football coach
Frank O'Neill (politician) (1893–1975), Australian politician and member of the New South Wales Legislative Assembly
Frank O'Neill (swimmer) (born 1926), Australian swimmer
Frank O'Neill (footballer) (born 1940), Irish footballer
Frank O'Neill (film director), director of The Overland Limited
Frank O'Neill (jockey) (1886–1960), American Hall of Fame jockey
Frank S. O'Neil (died 1945), American lawyer and athletic commissioner

See also
Frank O'Neal (1921–1986), cartoonist